The Battle of Kup was fought on 5 February 1762, between the Afghan forces of Ahmad Shah Durrani and the Sikhs, under the command of Jassa Singh Ahluwalia and Charat Singh. Ahmad Shah Durrani and the Afghan forces reached Malerkotla, west of Sirhind, where nearly 30,000 Sikh men, women, children and elderly were encamped. Abdali's forces outnumbered the Sikhs in hand to hand combat and the Sikhs couldn't use their usual tactics of hit and run, but had to engage in battle while protecting the civilians at the same time. With surprise attack, the Sikhs threw a human shield around civilians as protection and fought the battle killing several thousand Afghans. Abdali was able to break the ring and carried out a full scale massacre of the Sikh civilians. Ahmad Shah's forces killed several thousand Sikhs, and the surviving Sikhs fled to Barnala. As many as 10,000 to 20,000 Sikh men, women, elderly and children were killed in what is known as the second Sikh holocaust (Vadda Ghalughara).

References

Kup
1762 in India
Kup